Anitta is a Brazilian singer and songwriter. She has received several awards and nominations, including four Latin American Music Awards, seven MTV Europe Music Awards, a MTV Video Music Award and six Latin Grammy Award nominations. She has also received various Brazilian awards such as four Melhores do Ano, sixteen Multishow Brazilian Music Awards, eight Meus Prêmios Nick and nine MTV Millennial Awards Brazil.

She rose to national fame with the release of her single "Show das Poderosas" in 2013, for which she received two Multishow Brazilian Music Awards, including Video of the Year. In the following years she released three studio albums, Anitta in 2013, Ritmo Perfeito in 2014 and Bang! in 2015. In 2014, she received her first Latin Grammy nomination for Best Brazilian Song for "Zen", the same year the won her first MTV Europe Music Award for Best Brazilian Act, her first of five consecutive wins in the category.

Between 2016 and 2019, she collaborated with several Latin American and American artists, releasing songs both in Spanish and Portuguese, including "Downtown" with Colombian singer J. Balvin, which was nominated for the Latin Grammy Award for Best Urban Song in 2018 and "R.I.P." with Mexican singer Sofia Reyes and British singer Rita Ora, which won a Premio Lo Nuestro and a Latin American Music Award.

In 2019, she released her fourth studio album Kisses, receiving a nomination for the Latin Grammy Award for Best Urban Music Album. In 2022, she released her fifth album Versions of Me, the album was commercially successful and included the single "Envolver", Anitta's most successful single, garnering a Guinness World Record for being the first solo Latin artist to reach No.1 on Spotify. Additionally, the song won Best Latin at the 2022 MTV Video Music Awards, making her the first Brazilian artist to win a VMA.

Awards and Nominations

Other accolades

World records

Listicles

References 

Anitta
Awards